Donoghue may refer to:

Law
 Donoghue v Stevenson, 1932
 Donoghue v Folkestone Properties Ltd, 2003
 Donoghue v Allied, 1938

People
 Denis Donoghue (academic) (1928–2021), Irish literary critic
 Denis Donoghue (rugby league)
 Eileen Donoghue (born 1954), attorney
 Emma Donoghue, Irish-born playwright, literary historian and novelist
 Francis E. Donoghue (1872–1952), politician
 Joe Donoghue (1871–1921), speed skater
 John Donoghue (writer) (born 1964), British humourist and travel writer
 John Francis Donoghue
 John P. Donoghue (born 1957), American politician
 John Talbott Donoghue (1853–1903), American artist
 Lee Donoghue (born 1983), New Zealand actor
 Liam Donoghue (born 1974), Irish sportsperson
 Patrick Donoghue, footballer
 Philip Donoghue (born 1971), British palaeontologist
 Raymond Tasman Donoghue (1920–1960), Australian tram driver
 Richard Donoghue, American attorney and prosecutor, former United States deputy attorney general (2020–2021)
 Roger Donoghue (1930–2006), prizefighter
 Steve Donoghue (1884–1945), English flat-race jockey
 Tarah Donoghue
 William F. Donoghue Jr. (1921–2002), American mathematician

See also
Donahue
Donahoe
Donohue
O'Donoghue
O'Donohue